John Mitchels GAA are a Gaelic Athletic Association club based in Tralee, County Kerry, Ireland. They are based in the Boherbee and Camp area of Tralee. They play in Division 1 of the county league and in the Kerry Senior Football Championship.

Club history
Before 1927 only one team represented Tralee in the Kerry Senior Football County Championship and they were Tralee John Mitchels. As this team was so successful the Kerry County Board requested that it should be divided into three individual teams representing, Boherbee, Rock St. and Strand St, this is where the John Mitchels, Austin Stacks and Kerins O'Rahilly's clubs came from. The John Mitchels club since 1927 are thought to be one of the most successful clubs in Kerry. 

Between 1959 and 1963 they won five Senior Football titles in a row, the only team to do so in the history of the Kerry County Championship. John Mitchels Club are holders of 10 Senior, 1 U-21 and 3 Minor County Championships. 

They have also played in 3 Kerry Senior Club Hurling Championship finals in 1927 and 1928 losing both to Austin Stacks and 1936 they lost to St. Brendan's, Ardfert. 

Success has been limited of late, although John Mitchels player Brien Costello, captained Tralee CBS to Munster Colleges Senior 'A' Corn Uí Mhuirí Glory and in the All-Ireland Colleges Hogan Cup Final loss to Omagh CBS in 2007. In 2008 for the first time in the club's long history they dropped out of the Senior County Championship to the Kerry Intermediate Football Championship.

In 2014, the club moved to a new ground outside of Tralee, in Ballyseedy.

Honours
Kerry Senior Football Championship: 10
 1929, 1937, 1947, 1952, 1959, 1960, 1961, 1962, 1963, 1966

Team Captains

1929 – John Joe Sheehy (Captain),

1937 – Bill Kinnerk (Captain),

1947 – Joe Keohane (Captain),
 
1952 – Michéal "Haulie" Lynch (Captain),

1959 – Niall Sheehy (Captain),

1960 – Paudie Sheehy (Captain),

1961 – Fred Lynch (Captain),

1962 – Teddy O’Dowd (Captain),

1963 – Brian Sheehy (Captain),

1966 – Seamus Roche (Captain)

Finalists (6) – 1931, 1941, 1942, 1946, 1949, 1989

Semi-finals (11) – 1928, 1932, 1933, 1934, 1938, 1940, 1944, 1954, 1955, 1969, 1991

Munster Senior Club Football Championship
Finalists (1) 1967

Kerry Under 21 Football Championship: 1
1983

Captain

1983 – Jim O’Donnell,

Finalists (2) – 1985, 1995

Kerry Minor Football Championship: 3
1954, 1958, 1961

Team Captains

1954 – Fred Lynch (Captain),

1958 – Philo. Healy (Captain),

1961 –  Jimmy O’Mahony (Captain)

John Mitchels Kerry Captains to win the All- Ireland

Senior

1909 – Tom Costelloe,

1926 – John Joe Sheehy,

1930 – John Joe Sheehy,

1962 – Sean Og Sheehy,

Junior

2015 – Alan O'Donoghue

Minor

1931 – Jimmy O’Gorman

1962 – Jimmy O’Mahony,

U-21

1962 – Dom O'Donnell

1964 – Dom O'Donnell

48 players wore the Kerry jersey in Championship (1928–2010) and National League (1950–2014)

 PAUDIE SHEEHY
 87 Senior Appearances
 Career: 1949 – 1961
 Munster Senior Medals: 8
 All-Ireland Senior Medals: 4
 National Football League Medals: 2
 Munster Minor Medals: 2
 All-Ireland Minor Medals: 1
 Senior Championship Appearances: 35
 Senior League Appearances: 52
 Scored: 6–56 in Senior Championship. 9–88 in Senior League.

 NIALL SHEEHY (SNR)
 67 Senior Appearances 
 Career: 1958 – 1965
 Munster Senior Medals: 6
 All-Ireland Senior Medals: 2
 National Football leagues: 3
 Munster Junior Medals: 1 (Hurling)
 All-Ireland Junior Medals: 1(Hurling)
 Championship Appearances: 26
 League Appearances: 41
 Scored: 1–2 in League.

 ANTHONY GLEESON
 45 Senior Appearances 
 Career: 1989 – 1996
 Senior Championship Appearances: 10
 Senior League Appearances: 35
 Munster U-21 Medals: 1
 Scored: 0–2 in League.

 JOE KEOHANE 
 44 Senior Appearances 
 Career: 1936 – 1948 
 Munster Senior Medals: 10
 All-Ireland Senior Medals: 5
 Championship Appearances: 44
 Scored:

 MICK MORRIS
 43 Senior Appearances 
 Career: 1963 – 1969 
 Munster Senior Medals: 3
 All-Ireland Senior Medals: 1
 National Football League Medals: 2
 Munster Junior Medals: 1
 All-Ireland Junior Medals: 1
 Munster U-21 Medals: 1
 All-Ireland U-21 Medals: 1
 Senior Championship Appearances: 16
 Senior League Appearances: 27
 Scored:

 TIMMY DOWD
 43 Senior Appearances 
 Career: 1980 – 1987 
 Munster Senior Medals: 3
 All-Ireland Senior Medals: 3
 National Football League Medals: 1
 Munster Minor Medals: 1
 All-Ireland Minor Medals: 1
 Senior Championship Appearances: 12
 Senior League Appearances: 31
 Scored: 1–11 in Championship. 3–22 in League.

 JOHN JOE SHEEHY (SNR)
 37 Senior Appearances 
 Career: 1919 – 1930 
 Munster Senior Medals: 6
 All-Ireland Senior Medals: 4
 Nation Football League Medals: 2
 Senior Championship Appearances: 37
 Scored: 4–22 in Championship.

 JOHN HIGGINS
 35 Senior Appearances 
 Career: 1983 – 1987
 Munster Senior Medals: 3 
 All-Ireland Senior Medals: 3
 National Football Medals: 1
 Munster U-21 Medals: 1
 Senior Championship Appearances: 5
 Senior League Appearances: 30
 Scored:

 TADGH HEALY
 34 Senior Appearances 
 Career: 1937 – 1945 
 Munster Senior Medals: 4
 All-Ireland Senior Medals: 4
 Senior Championship Appearances: 27
 Senior League Appearances: 7
 Scored: 0–1 in Championship. 0–2 in League.

 WILLIAM “Bruddy” O’DONNELL
 23 Senior Appearances 
 Career: 1941 – 1951 
 Munster Senior Medals: 3
 All-Ireland Senior Medals: 1
 Munster Junior Medals: 1
 All-Ireland Junior Medals: 1
 Senior Championship Appearances: 18
 Senior League Appearances: 5
 Scored: 8–23 in Championship. 1–8 in League.

 SEANIE BURROWS
 22 Senior Appearances 
 Career: 1965 – 1968
 Munster Senior Medals: 2
 Munster U-21 Medals: 3
 All-Ireland U-21 Medals: 1
 Munster Minor Medals: 2
 All-Ireland Minor Medals: 2
 Senior Championship Appearances: 10
 Senior League Appearances: 12
 Scored: 2–1 in League.

 GARRY O’MAHONY
 21 Senior Appearances 
 Career: 1954 – 1956 
 Munster Senior Medals:
 All-Ireland Senior Medals: 1
 Munster Junior Medals: 1
 All-Ireland Junior Medals: 1
 Senior Championship Appearances: 7
 Senior League Appearances: 14
 Scored:

 PADDY WHITTY
 19 Senior Appearances 
 Career: 1928 – 1936
 Munster Senior Medals: 4
 All-Ireland Senior Medals: 2
 National Football League Medals: 4
 Munster Junior Medals: 1
 Senior Championship Appearances: 19
 Scored: 0–6 in Championship.

 BILL KINNERK
 19 Senior Appearances 
 Career: 1928 – 1938
 Munster Senior Medals: 5
 All-Ireland Senior Medals: 2 
 National Football League Medals: 4
 Munster Junior Medals: 2
 All Ireland Junior Medals: 1
 Senior Championship Appearances: 19
 Scored:

 CON GEANEY
 15 Senior Appearances 
 Career: 1931 – 1938 
 Munster Senior Medals: 5
 All-Ireland Senior Medals: 3
 National Football League Medals: 2
 Senior Championship Appearances: 15
 Scored: 2–9 in Championship.

 SEAN-ÓG SHEEHY
 14 Senior Appearances 
 Career: 1962 – 1963 
 Munster Senior Medals: 2
 All-Ireland Senior Medals: 1
 National Football League Medals: 1
 Munster Junior Medals: 1
 Senior Championship Appearances: 7
 Senior League Appearances: 7
 Scored: 1–0 in Championship. 0–4 in League.

 DOM O’DONNELL
 12 Senior Appearances 
 Career: 1962 – 1969 
 Munster Senior Medals: 1
 All-Ireland Senior Medals: 1
 National Football League Medals: 2
 Munster Junior Medals: 2
 All-Ireland Junior Medals: 1
 Munster U-21 Medals: 2
 All-Ireland U-21 Medals: 1
 Senior Championship Appearances: 5
 Senior League Appearances: 7
 Scored: 4–1 in Championship. 2–4 in League.

 DERRY O’SHEA
 11 Senior Appearances 
 Career: 1963 – 1966
 Munster Senior Medals: 1
 National Football League Medals: 1
 Munster Junior Medals: 2
 All-Ireland Junior Medals: 1
 Munster U-21 Medals: 1
 All-Ireland U-21 Medals: 1
 Munster Minor Medals: 1
 All-Ireland Minor Medals: 1
 Senior Championship Appearances: 5
 Senior League Appearances: 6
 Scored: 3–5 in Championship. 1–3 in League.

 BRIAN SHEEHY
 11 Senior Appearances 
 Career: 1959 – 1961
 Munster Senior Medals: 1
 National Football League Medals: 2
 Munster Junior Medals: 4
 All-Ireland Junior Medals: 1
 Senior Championship Appearances: 3
 Senior League Appearances: 8
 Scored: 1–0 in Championship. 3–3 in League.

 DONAL MC EVOY
 11 Senior Appearances 
 Career: 1988 – 1988
 Senior Championship Appearances: 1
 Senior League Appearances: 10
 Scored: 1–1 in Championship. 1–6 in League. 
 Munster u-21 medals: 2

 JOHNNY RIORDAN
 10 Senior Appearances 
 Career: 1928 – 1931
 Munster Senior Medals: 5
 All-Ireland Senior Medals: 4
 National Football League Medals: 3
 Munster Junior Medals: 1
 All-Ireland Junior Medals: 1
 Senior Championship Appearances: 10
 Scored:

 TEDDY DOWD
 10 Senior Appearances 
 Career: 1961 – 1961
 Munster Senior Medals: 1
 National Football League Medals: 1
 Munster Junior Medals: 3
 All-Ireland Junior Medals: 1
 Munster Minor Medals: 1
 Senior Championship Appearances: 3
 Senior League Appearances: 7
 Scored: 0–1 in Championship. 3–1 in League.

 FRANK O’KEEFFE
 9 Senior Appearances 
 Career: 1946 – 1950 
 Munster Senior Medals: 3
 All-Ireland Senior Medals: 1
 Munster Junior Medals: 1
 Senior Championship Appearances: 7
 Senior League Appearances: 2
 Scored: 5–1 in Championship. 1–0 in League. 

  ALAN CONWAY
 8 Senior Appearances 
 Career: 1961 – 1962
 National Football League Medals: 1
 Munster Junior Medals: 1
 Munster Minor Medals: 2
 Senior Championship Appearances: 1
 Senior League Appearances: 7
 Scored:

 SEAMUS ROCHE
 7 Senior Appearances 
 Career: 1962 – 1963 
 Munster Senior Medals:
 All-Ireland Senior Medals: 1
 Senior Championship Appearances: 3
 National Football League Medals: 1
 Munster U-21 Medals: 1
 Senior League Appearances: 4
 Scored: 1–0 in Championship. 1–0 in League.

 JOHN "Thorney" O’SHEA
 7 Senior Appearances 
 Career: 1965 – 1967
 Munster Junior Medals: 1
 Senior Championship Appearances: 3
 Senior League Appearances: 4
 Scored: 0–10 in Championship. 0–4 in League.

 JOHN JOE SHEEHY (JNR)
 5 Senior Appearances 
 Career: 1988 – 1988
 Senior League Appearances: 5
 Scored:

 Jackie Ryan
 4 Senior Appearances
 Career: 1924 – 1934
 Munster Senior Medals: 2
 All-Ireland Medals: 6
 National Football League Medals: 4
 Championship Appearances: 4
 Scored: 0–6 in Championship.

 BRENDAN GALVIN
 4 Senior Appearances 
 Career: 1952 – 1952
 Munster Junior Medals: 2
 All-Ireland Junior Medals: 1
 Munster Minor Medals: 2
 All-Ireland Minor Medals: 1
 Senior Championship Appearances: 1
 Senior League Appearances: 3
 Scored: 0–1 in Championship. 1–1 in League.

 MICHEAL “Haulie” LYNCH
 4 Senior Appearances 
 Career: 1953 – 1953
 Munster Junior Medals: 1
 All-Ireland Junior Medals: 1
 Munster Minor Medals: 2
 All-Ireland Minor Medals: 1
 Senior League Appearances: 4
 Scored:

 TOMMY DOWLING
 3 Senior Appearances 
 Career: 1950 – 1950
 Senior Championship Appearances: 1
 Senior League Appearances: 2
 Scored:

 HARRY BOURKE
 3 Senior Appearances 
 Career: 1963 – 1967 
 National Football League Medals: 1
 Munster Junior Medals: 1
 All-Ireland Junior Medals: 1
 Senior League Appearances: 3
 Scored:

 EDDIE DUNNE
 3 Senior Appearances 
 Career: 1944 – 1945
 Munster Junior Medals: 1
 Senior Championship Appearances: 3
 Scored: 2–2 in Championship.

 TED FITZGERALD
 3 Senior Appearances 
 Senior Career: 1967 – 1967 
 Munster Junior Medals: 1
 All-Ireland Junior Medals: 1 
 Munster U-21 Medals: 1
 All-Ireland U-21 Medals: 1
 Munster Minor Medals: 1
 All-Ireland Minor Medals: 1
 Senior League Appearances: 3
 Scored:

 JOHN “Cinders”s O’CONNOR
 2 Senior Appearances 
 Career: 1928 – 1933 
 Munster Senior Medals: 1
 All-Ireland Senior Medals: 1
 National Football League Medals: 4
 Senior Championship Appearances: 2
 Scored: 1–0 in Championship.

 MICHEAL Ó’RUAIRC
 2 Senior Appearances 
 Career: 1929 – 1930 
 Munster Senior Medals: 2
 All-Ireland Medals: 2 
 National Football League Medals: 1
 Munster Junior Medals: 2
 All-Ireland Junior Medals: 1
 Championship Appearances: 2
 Scored: 1–1 in Championship.

 TOMMY MURPHY
 2 Senior Appearances 
 Career: 1937 – 1938
 Senior Championship Appearances: 2
 Scored:

 EUGENE POWELL
 2 Senior Appearances 
 Career: 1938 – 1938
 Munster Junior Medals: 1
 All-Ireland Junior Medals: 1
 Senior Championship Appearances: 2
 Scored: 0–3 in Championship.

 PADDY O’DONOGHUE
 2 Senior Appearances 
 Career: 1942 – 1944
 senior Championship Appearances: 2
 Scored: 2–1 in Championship.

 D J MC MAHON
 2 Senior Appearances 
 Career: 1950 – 1950
 Senior Championship Appearances: 2
 Scored: 1–0 in Championship.

 JOHN DOWD
 2 Senior Appearances
 Career: 1983 – 1983
 Senior League Appearances: 2

 RORY KILGALLEN
 2 Senior Appearances
 Career: 1984 – 1984
 Senior League Appearances: 2
 National Football League Medals: 1
 Munster U-21 Medals; 1
 Scored:

 BRENDAN O’MAHONY
 2 Senior Appearance 
 Career: 2004 – 2014
 Senior League Appearances: 1
 Mc Grath Cup Appearances: 1

 MICHAEL O’GORMAN
 1 Senior Appearance
 Career: 1937 – 1937 
 Munster Senior Medals: 1
 All-Ireland Medals: 1
 Championship Appearances: 1
 Scored: 2–1 in Championship.

 JOHN MC CARTHY
 1 Senior Appearance 
 Career: 1939 – 1939
 Munster Senior Medals: 1
 All-Ireland Senior Medals: 1

 JAMES PIERCE
 I Senior appearance
 Career; 1941
 Munster Senior Medals: 1
 All-Ireland Senior Medals: 1

 CARL O’SULLIVAN
 1 Senior Appearance 
 Career: 1946 – 1946
 Munster Senior Medals: 1
 All-Ireland Senior Medals: 1
 Championship Appearances: 1

 NICHOLAS O’DONOGHUE
 1 Senior Appearance 
 Career: 1946 – 1946
 Munster Senior Medals: 1
 All-Ireland Senior Medals: 1
 Championship Appearances: 1

Notable players
 Tommy Doyle
 Anthony Gleeson
 Paddy Kelly
 Joe Keohane
 Mick Morris
 Dom O'Donnell
 Timmy O'Dowd
 John Joe Sheehy
 Niall Sheehy
 Paudie Sheehy
 Seán Óg Sheehy
- John Reardon

References

External links
Official John Mitchels GAA Club website

Gaelic games clubs in County Kerry
Gaelic football clubs in County Kerry
Hurling clubs in County Kerry
Sport in Tralee